Maesa lanceolata, the false assegai, is a tree species that is widespread in the Afrotropics, including Madagascar. It occurs from the southern Arabian Peninsula, southwards to the Eastern Cape, South Africa. It grows on stream verges, river banks and forest verges, where it is often a pioneer plant.

References

 Algemene gids tot BOME. Keith, Paul & Meg Coates Palgrave. 2000.

External links
 

lanceolata
Afrotropical realm flora
Trees of Africa
Flora of the Arabian Peninsula
Flora of East Tropical Africa
Flora of South Tropical Africa
Flora of Southern Africa
Flora of Madagascar